Denis Kessler (born 25 March 1952) is a French businessman. He has served as the chairman of the board of directors and chief executive officer of SCOR SE since 2002. Prior to this, he served as Vice-Chairman of MEDEF and CEO of AXA.

Biography
He graduated from HEC Paris, and received a PhD in Economics from the University of Paris.

He is a board member of BNP Paribas, Bolloré, Dassault Aviation, Invesco, and Fonds stratégique d'investissement. He is member of the Supervisory Board of Yam Invest N.V. He served as the President of Le Siècle from 2007 to 2010.

He has criticized the Keynesian reaction to the 2008 financial crisis, and he has suggested the end of the Euro currency is a real possibility.

References

1952 births
Living people
Businesspeople from Mulhouse
French chief executives
HEC Paris alumni
Pantheon-Sorbonne University alumni
Officiers of the Légion d'honneur